Inside Information is a 1939 American mystery film directed by Charles Lamont. The film stars Dick Foran, Harry Carey, and June Lang. It was released on June 2, 1939. During production, the working title of the film was Metropolitan Police.

Cast
 Dick Foran as Danny Blake
 Harry Carey as Captain Bill Dugan
 June Lang as Kathleen Burke
 Mary Carlisle as Crystal
 Addison Richards as Banford, aka Max Stockton
 Joe Sawyer as Grazzi
 Grant Richards as Charles Bixby
 Selmer Jackson as Huxley
 Paul McVey as Crawford
 Frederick Burton as Commissioner Fenton

Production
In 1937, Universal Pictures made a deal with Crime Club, who were published of whodunnits. Over the next few years Universal released several mystery films in the series. The film was developed under the title Metropolitan Police.

Inside Information was based on an unpublished novel "47th Precinct" by Burnet Hershey and Martin Mooney. Mooney was a real-life New York City crime reporter who went to prison for refusing to reveal his news sources.

Release
Inside Information was distributed by Universal Pictures on June 2, 1939.

References

Footnotes

Sources

External links
 
 

American mystery films
1939 mystery films
1939 films
Films directed by Charles Lamont
American black-and-white films
Universal Pictures films
1930s American films
1930s English-language films